Leigh Mills (born 8 February 1988) is an English former professional footballer who was signed to Tottenham Hotspur between 2004 and 2009.

Since February 2023, Leigh Mills signed a short term contract for YMCA Newbury, scoring the opening goal in a 2-1 win against Beacon in the National Christian Cup where Jamie Killner received the MOTM award for a dominant defensive display.

Career

Tottenham Hotspur
Mills started his career as a youth team player at Swindon Town but was signed by Tottenham Hotspur as a 16-year-old in 2004 before he had made a league appearance for the Robins.

Mills joined Brentford in a season-long loan deal on 17 June 2008. On 8 August he was recalled by Tottenham and joined Gillingham on loan, subsequently extended from one month to five. Mills made his Gillingham and professional debut in a 1–0 home defeat against Luton Town on 16 August. The loan ended on 1 January 2009, and in February, Mills was released from his contract.

Others 
In July 2010, Mills signed for his hometown club Winchester City on a free transfer.

In September 2012 he signed for Conference South side Eastleigh. Mills was released on 18 January 2013, after making nine league appearances for the Spitfires.

In January 2013, Mills signed for Wessex side Blackfield & Langley.

He is now a P.E teacher at Rookwood School, Hampshire.

References

External links
 gillinghamfootballclub.com Profile
 tottenhamhotspur.com Profile

Living people
1988 births
Association football defenders
English footballers
Swindon Town F.C. players
Tottenham Hotspur F.C. players
Brentford F.C. players
Gillingham F.C. players
Winchester City F.C. players
Eastleigh F.C. players
Blackfield & Langley F.C. players
Wessex Football League players